The Palais du Peuple (Palace of the People) is a venue for important events in Conakry, Guinea. In 2008, the building underwent serious renovations prior to celebrations for Guinea's 50th anniversary of independence.

See also
List of buildings and structures in Guinea

References

Buildings and structures in Conakry
Palaces in Guinea
Chinese aid to Africa